Yamila Cafrune (born in Buenos Aires, November 16, 1965) is an Argentine folk music singer. She is the daughter of Jorge Cafrune, who was also a folklore singer. She currently lives in Cañuelas, a small town in Buenos Aires Province.

Born November 16, 1965, she has 2 sisters. Her parents named her Yamila in honour of Djamila Boupacha. One of her sisters – Eva Encarnación Cafrune is named after Eva Perón and Encarnación – the wife of 19th century Buenos Aires province caudillo Juan Manuel de Rosas. The other is called Victoria, after Doña Victoria – the wife of "Chacho" Peñaloza. Her brother Juan Facundo Cafrune is named after the caudillo Rioja Facundo Quiroga.

Yamila released her album En Vivo ("Live") in 2006. The CD has twelve songs, recorded in December 2005 in the Gregorio de Laferrère theatre in Morón. The song list is varied, with tracks that include "Your mark on me", Diego Gallo, "The finadita" of the brothers Diaz, "Road to the rodeo" by Roberto Ternan, "Juana Azurduy" Ramirez and Luna, "Father" "Heritage" and "Zamba de mi esperanza".

See also
 Music of Argentina
 Folk Music

Sources

External links
 

1965 births
Living people
21st-century Argentine women singers
Argentine folk singers
Singers from Buenos Aires